C&A is a multinational of retail clothing stores.

C&A may also refer to:

 C&A (cycling team)
 Camden and Amboy Railroad
 Casey and Andy
 Certification and Accreditation
 Chicago and Alton Railroad
 Coal & Allied
 Cowboys and Aliens (disambiguation)